Megachile rossi is a species of bee in the family Megachilidae. It was described by Mitchell in 1943.

References

Rossi
Insects described in 1943